is a railway station on the  Nanao Line in the town of Anamizu, Hōsu District, Ishikawa Prefecture, Japan, operated by the private railway operator Noto Railway.

Lines

Station layout
The station consists of one ground-level side platform, one island platform and one bay platform, connected by a footbridge. However, only Platform 1 is current in use. The station is staffed.

Platforms

History
Anamizu Station opened on 27 August 1932 as a station on the Nanao Line. Operations on the Noto Line to  began on 15 June 1959. With the privatization of Japanese National Railways (JNR) on 1 April 1987, the station came under the control of JR West. On 1 September 1991, the section of the Nanao Line from Nanao to Anamizu was separated from JR West into the Noto Railway. Operations on the  Noto Line were discontinued from 1 April  2005.

Passenger statistics
In fiscal 2015, the station was used by an average of 210 passengers daily (boarding passengers only).

Surrounding area

Anamizu Town Hall

See also
 List of railway stations in Japan

External links

References

Railway stations in Ishikawa Prefecture
Railway stations in Japan opened in 1932
Nanao Line
Anamizu, Ishikawa